The Indios de Canóvanas (lit. "Canóvanas Indians") was a BSN basketball team that was based in Canóvanas, Puerto Rico.

History
The Indios were active for several years in the league, winning the championship in 1983 and 1984. They also reached the finals in 1988, but lost to the Vaqueros de Bayamón. Despite their success in the 1980s, the team disappeared in the 1990s. There have been movements to reestablish the team, but they have been unsuccessful.

Guard Angelo Cruz and center Ramón Ramos were two of the team key players during the 1980s.

References

External links
Puerto Rican League official website

External links
 Baloncesto Superior Nacional

BSN teams